Combined gas and steam (COGAS) is the name given to marine compound powerplants comprising gas and steam turbines, the latter being driven by steam generated using the heat from the exhaust of the gas turbines. In this way, some of the otherwise lost energy can be reclaimed and the specific fuel consumption of the plant can be decreased. Large (land-based) electric powerplants built using this combined cycle can reach conversion efficiencies of over 60%.

If the turbines do not drive a propeller shafts directly and instead a turbo-electric transmission is used, the system is also known as COGES.

COGAS differs from many other combined marine propulsion systems in that it is not intended to operate on one system alone. While this is possible, it will not operate efficiently this way, as with Combined diesel and gas systems when run solely on diesel engines. Especially COGAS should not be confused with Combined steam and gas (COSAG) power plants, which employ traditional, oil-fired boilers for steam turbine propulsion for normal cruising, and supplement this with gas turbines for faster reaction times and higher dash speed.

COGAS has been proposed as upgrade for ships that use gas turbines as their main (or only) engines, e.g. in COGOG or COGAG mode, such as the s, but currently no naval ship uses this concept. However some modern cruise ships  are equipped with COGES. E.g. Celebrity Cruises' Millennium and other ships of her class use turbo-electric plants with two General Electric LM2500+ gas turbines and one steam-turbine.

BMW is currently researching combined gas and steam for automotive use, using their turbosteamer system. This uses the waste heat of combustion from the exhaust and turns it into steam to produce torque which is input into the crankshaft.

See also
Cogeneration
Combined cycle
Combined cycle powered railway locomotive

References

External links
Gizmag article discussing BMW's turbosteamer
Article on BMW's alternative Combined Cycle Hybrid technology

Marine propulsion
Steam power

de:Gas-und-Dampf-Kombikraftwerk